The 1973–74 season was Chelsea Football Club's sixtieth competitive season.

Table

References

External links
 1973–74 season at stamford-bridge.com

1973–74
English football clubs 1973–74 season